Michal, was the daughter of King Saul in the Hebrew Bible, wife of King David.

Michal or Michale may also refer to one of the following:

 Michal, Czech and Slovak counterpart of the name Michael
 Tel Michal, archaeological site in Israel
 Michale, a village in Poland
 Micah Joseph Lebensohn, Hebrew poet known by pen name Michal

People with the given name

Michal
Michal (singer) (born 1983), Polish singer, famous in France
Michal Biran (born 1978), Israeli politician
Michal Březina (born 1990), Czech figure skater
Michal Escapa (born 1937), Israeli paralympic champion
Michal Feldman (born 1976), Israeli computer scientist
Michal Frankl (born 1974), Czech historian
Michal Hein (born 1968), Israeli Olympic windsurfer
Michal Jagelka (born 1977), Czech actor
Michal Lamdani (born 1944), Israeli Olympic high jumper
Michal Menert (born 1982), Polish-born American electronic music producer
Michal Menet (born 1997), American football player
Michal Rivlin, Israeli neuroscientist
Michal Rozin (born 1969), Israeli politician and feminist
Michal Schwartz (born 1950), Israeli professor of neuroimmunology

Michale
Michale Boganim, French Israeli film director and screenwriter
Michale Fee (born 1964), American neuroscientist
Michale Graves (born 1975), American singer songwriter
Michale Kyser (born 1991), American basketball player
Michale Spicer (born 1982), American defensive end football player

People with the surname
Karel Michal, Czech writer
Kristen Michal, Estonian politician

See also
 Michał (disambiguation)

Czech masculine given names
Slovak masculine given names